is a Japanese professional baseball infielder for the Fukuoka SoftBank Hawks of Nippon Professional Baseball (NPB).

He is the world record holder with a record of 13 consecutive games with stolen bases.

Early baseball career
Shuto participated three times in the Japan National Collegiate Baseball Championship and once in the Meiji Shrine Baseball Championship while studying at the Tokyo University of Agriculture Hokkaido Okhotsk.

In 2017, he was selected most valuable player in the Hokkaido Universities Baseball League.

Professional career
On October 26, 2017, Shuto was drafted as a developmental player by the Fukuoka SoftBank Hawks in the 2017 Nippon Professional Baseball draft.

In 2018 season, he played in informal matches against the Shikoku Island League Plus's teams and amateur baseball teams, and played in the Western League of NPB's second leagues. On October 3, despite being a developmental player, he was selected as the Japan national baseball team for the 2018 U-23 Baseball World Cup because of his speed and defense.

On March 26, 2019,  Shuto signed a 6 million yen contract with the Fukuoka SoftBank Hawks as a registered player under control. In the 2019 season, he played mainly as a defensive player and a pinch runner and recorded 25 stolen bases while being caught five times while batting .196/.212/.294 in 102 at bats.

On October 30, 2020, Shuto achieved 13 games consecutive stolen bases, breaking the NPB record for Yutaka Fukumoto's 11  games consecutive stolen bases in 1974 and the MLB record for 12  games consecutive stolen bases for Bert Campaneris in 1969. In 2020 season, Shuto won the Pacific League stolen bases leader award with a record of 50 stolen bases, and  hitting .270/.325/.352 in 307 at bats, with a one home run , a 27 RBIs. In the 2020 Japan Series against the Yomiuri Giants, Shuto contributed to the team's fourth consecutive Japan Series championship with one hit, one stolen base and good defense. December 17, Shuto was honored for the Pacific League Stolen bases Leader Award and NPB Commissioner's Special Award at the NPB AWARD 2020.

In 2021 season, he had played in the season opener, but on June 10 he broke the index finger of his right hand and was dropped from the first team registration.He also underwent surgery on his right shoulder on September 10, the team announced. Because of this, he only played in 70 games, finishing the season with a .201 batting average, three home runs, five runs batted in, and 21 stolen bases.

On June 7, 2022, Shuto recorded a total of 100 stolen bases in the interleague play against the Hanshin Tigers. He also hit his first walk-off home run on June 18 against the Tohoku Rakuten Golden Eagles and his first lead-off home run on August 4 against the Hokkaido Nippon-Ham Fighters. In 2022 season, he finished the regular season with a .267 batting average, a five home runs, a 15 RBI, and a 22 stolen bases in 80 games.

International career 
On October 3, 2018, despite being a developmental player, he was selected as the Japan national baseball team for the 2018 U-23 Baseball World Cup because of his speed and defense.

On October 1, 2019, unusual case, Shuto was evaluated for base-running technique as a pinch runner and was selected as the Japan national baseball top team for the 2019 WBSC Premier12 tournament. He led the tournament with four stolen bases.

Shuto was called up to the Japan national baseball team for the Samurai Japan Series 2022 and recorded a stolen base against the Australia on November 10, 2022.

References

External links

 Career statistics - NPB.jp
 23 Ukyo Shuto PLAYERS2022 - Fukuoka SoftBank Hawks Official site

1996 births
Living people
Fukuoka SoftBank Hawks players
Japanese expatriate baseball players in Puerto Rico
Nippon Professional Baseball infielders
Tokyo University of Agriculture alumni
Baseball people from Gunma Prefecture
2019 WBSC Premier12 players
2023 World Baseball Classic players
Gigantes de Carolina players